The 1989 PBA Reinforced Conference Finals was the best-of-7 series basketball championship of the 1989 PBA Reinforced Conference, and the conclusion of the conference's playoffs. The San Miguel Beermen and the Añejo Rum 65ers played for the 44th championship contested by the league.

The San Miguel Beermen won their finals series against Añejo Rum 65ers, four games to one, becoming the third team in PBA history to achieve the distinction of capturing the Grandslam.

Qualification

Series scoring summary

Games summary

Game 1

Elmer Reyes opened up with a booming triple, Yves Dignadice knock in an 18-foot jumper and Ramon Fernandez came off the bench to sizzle with a perimeter basket that highlighted a nine-point blast from a 110–111 deficit that sent the Beermen ahead at 119–111, 4:03 left in the game, with 25 seconds left to play, the Beermen ahead, 132–122, Rudy Distrito hit Alvin Teng on a rebound play, forcing the San Miguel player to retaliate with a shove.

Game 2

The second game was poorly officiated as rookie referees, Benjie Chua, Bernie de Dios and Gregorio Llaguno, failed to keep the game under control. San Miguel went up 74–66 at halftime and 108–100 at the end of the third quarter, a total of four technicals were given to Añejo while the referees give San Miguel only one warning through a deliberate foul by Ramon Fernandez against Carlos Briggs, the Añejo import, who scored a record 84 points, was clobbered by a triple-man defense during driving plays and no fouls were called, at the final buzzer, Rudy Distrito flung his elbows wildly at Fernandez, unruly fans triggered off a riotous protest against poor officiating, the aftermath of Game 2 had debris-throwing incident and bloody fighting among spectators.

Game 3

Game 3 had two postponements because of the impending coup against the Philippine government. Prior to the third game, PBA Commissioner Rudy Salud issued a summon for Añejo playing coach Robert Jaworski and coach Norman Black of San Miguel in an effort to crush the brewing violence-related crisis within the pro-league, the 65ers' Rudy Distrito was suspended in Game three after Salud found him guilty of rough plays against Ennis Whatley in the chaotic Game two. Carlos Briggs scored 71 points but it was reserve-center Peter Aguilar's three-point play that broke the last deadlock at 133-all, as Añejo escaped with a victory to cut the series deficit to 2–1.

Game 4

Ricardo Brown and Ennis Whatley combined for 71 points as San Miguel led from start to finish, Yves Dignadice sparked a 16–4 run that gave the Beermen a 17-point spread, 62–45, with 1:33 left before halftime. San Miguel enjoyed leads as much as 22 points with the last at 95–73.

Game 5

Trailing by six points, 43–49 at halftime, San Miguel broke even at 78-all going into the last 12 minutes of play, a 9–3 burst opened a six-point advantage for the beermen at 87–81. With 8:53 left in the final period and the Beermen ahead by only two points, 87–85, import Ennis Whatley committed his sixth and final foul off a driving Joey Loyzaga, the Beermen had to play all-Filipino in the last 8:42 and Ricardo Brown combined with Hector Calma and Samboy Lim as San Miguel began pulling away with a 15-point margin at 116–101.

Rosters

Broadcast notes

References

1989
1989 PBA season
San Miguel Beermen games
Barangay Ginebra San Miguel games
PBA Reinforced Conference Finals
PBA Reinforced Conference Finals